Cyril (born Constantine, 826–869) and Methodius (815–885) were two brothers and Byzantine Christian theologians and missionaries. For their work evangelizing the Slavs, they are known as the "Apostles to the Slavs".

They are credited with devising the Glagolitic alphabet, the first alphabet used to transcribe Old Church Slavonic. After their deaths, their pupils continued their missionary work among other Slavs. Both brothers are venerated in the Eastern Orthodox Church as saints with the title of "equal-to-apostles". In 1880, Pope Leo XIII introduced their feast into the calendar of the Roman Catholic Church. In 1980, the first Slav pope, Pope John Paul II declared them co-patron saints of Europe, together with Benedict of Nursia.

Early career

Early life
The two brothers were born in Thessalonica, then located in the Byzantine province of the same name (today in Greece) – Cyril in about 827–828 and Methodius in about 815–820. According to the Vita Cyrilli ("The Life of Cyril"), Cyril was reputedly the youngest of seven brothers; he was born Constantine, but was given the name Cyril upon becoming a monk in Rome shortly before his death. Methodius was born Michael and was given the name Methodius upon becoming a monk in Polychron Monastery at Mysian Olympus (present-day Uludağ in northwest Turkey). Their father was Leo, a droungarios of the Byzantine theme of Thessalonica, and their mother's name was Maria.

The exact ethnic origins of the brothers are unknown, there is controversy as to whether Cyril and Methodius were of Slavic<ref>
 1. Mortimer Chambers, Barbara Hanawalt, Theodore Rabb, Isser Woloch, Raymond Grew. The Western Experience with Powerweb. Eighth Edition. McGraw-Hill Higher Education 2002. University of Michigan.  p. 214. 
 ...Two Christian brothers of Slavic descent, Cyril and Methodius, set out in about 862 as missionaries from the Byzantine...

 2. Balkan Studies, Volume 22. Hidryma Meletōn Chersonēsou tou Haimou (Thessalonikē, Greece). The Institute, 1981. Original from	the University of Michigan. p. 381
 ...Being of Slavic descent, both of them spoke the old Slavic language fluently...

 3. Loring M. Danforth. The Macedonian Conflict: Ethnic Nationalism in a Transnational World. Princeton University Press, 1995. p. 49 .
 ...In the ninth century two brothers Cyril and Methodius, Macedonian educators of Slavic origin from Solun, brought literacy and Christianity to the Slavs...

 4. Ihor Ševčenko. Byzantium and the Slavs: In Letters and Culture'''. Harvard Ukrainian Research Institute, 1991. p. 481. 
 ...63-68 (Cyril and Methodius were Slavs)...There remains that argument for Cyril's and Methodius' Slavic origin which has to do with the Slavic translation of the Gospels and...

 5. Roland Herbert Bainton. Christianity: An American Heritage Book Series. Houghton Mifflin Harcourt, 2000. p. 156. 
 ...Two missionaries of Slavic origin, Cyril (baptized Constantine) and Methodius, adapted the Greek alphabet and translated both the Bible and the liturgy into the Slavic tongue...

 6. John Shea. Macedonia and Greece: The Struggle to Define a New Balkan Nation. McFarland, 1997. p. 56 . 
 ...Byzantine emperor Michael, on the request of the Moravian prince Ratislav, decided to send Slav priests as educators, he chose the Salonika brothers Cyril and Methodius...

 7. UNESCO Features: A Fortnightly Press Service. UNESCO. United Nations Educational, Scientific and Cultural Organization, 1984. University of Michigan
 ...They may have been of wholly Slavic descent or of mixed Greco-Slav origin...

 8. The Pakistan Review, Volume 19. Ferozsons Limited, 1971. University of California. p. 41
 ...century in Salonika, then one of the largest towns in the Byzantine Empire. The brothers were of Slav origin...

 9. Balkania, Volume 7. Balkania Publishing Company, 1973. Indiana University. p. 10
 ...Cyril and Methodius not only lived among Slavs. ...of Slavonic, which they not only spoke and understood, but in which they also wrote—translated and composed—and for which they invented an alphabet, is proof of their Slav origin...

 10.  Bryce Dale Lyon, Herbert Harvey Rowen, Theodore S. Hamerow. A History of the Western World, Volume 1. Rand McNally College Pub. Co., 1974. Northwestern University. p. 239
 ...brothers of Slavic origin, Cyril and Methodius, who, after being ordained at Constantinople, preached the Gospel to the Slavs...

 11. Roland Herbert Bainton. The history of Christianity. Nelson, 1964. p. 169
 ...Two missionaries of Slavic origin, Cyril (baptized Constantine) and Methodius, adapted the Greek alphabet and translated both the Bible and the liturgy into the Slavic tongue...

 12. Carl Waldman, Catherine Mason. Encyclopedia of European Peoples: Facts on File library of world history. Infobase Publishing, 2006. p. 752. 
 ...There is disagreement as to whether Cyril and his brother Methodius were Greek or Slavic, but they knew the Slavic dialect spoken in Macedonia...

 13. Frank Andrews. Ancient Slavs'. Worzalla Publishing Company, 1976. University of Wisconsin - Madison. p. 163.
 ...Cyril and Methodius derived from a rich family of Salonica, perhaps of Slavic origin, but Grecized in those times. Methodius (815–885)...

 14. Johann Heinrich Kurtz, John Macpherson. Church History. Hodder and Stoughton, 1891. University of California. p. 431
 ...Born at Thessalonica, and so probably of Slavic descent, at least acquainted with the language of the Slavs,...

 15. William Leslie King. Investment and Achievement: A Study in Christian Progress. Jennings and Graham, 1913. Columbia University.
 ...This man and his brother Cyril became the Methodius and Cyril apostles of the Slavic people. These two brothers seemed to have been raised up for such a mission. They were probably of Slavic descent...</ref> or Greek origin, or both. The two brothers lost their father when Cyril was fourteen, and the powerful minister Theoktistos, who was logothetes tou dromou, one of the chief ministers of the Empire, became their protector. He was also responsible, along with the regent Bardas, for initiating a far-reaching educational program within the Empire which culminated in the establishment of the University of Magnaura, where Cyril was to teach. Cyril was ordained as priest some time after his education, while his brother Methodius remained a deacon until 867/868.

Mission to the Khazars
About the year 860, Byzantine Emperor Michael III and the Patriarch of Constantinople Photius (a professor of Cyril's at the University and his guiding light in earlier years), sent Cyril on a missionary expedition to the Khazars who had requested a scholar be sent to them who could converse with both Jews and Saracens. It has been claimed that Methodius accompanied Cyril on the mission to the Khazars, but this may be a later invention. The account of his life presented in the Latin "Legenda" claims that he learned the Khazar language while in Chersonesos, in Taurica (today Crimea).

After his return to Constantinople, Cyril assumed the role of professor of philosophy at the University while his brother had by this time become a significant figure in Byzantine political and administrative affairs, and an abbot of his monastery.

Mission to the Slavs
 Great Moravia 

In 862, the brothers began the work which would give them their historical importance. That year Prince Rastislav of Great Moravia requested that Emperor Michael III and the Patriarch Photius send missionaries to evangelize his Slavic subjects. His motives in doing so were probably more political than religious. Rastislav had become king with the support of the Frankish ruler Louis the German, but subsequently sought to assert his independence from the Franks. It is a common misconception that Cyril and Methodius were the first to bring Christianity to Moravia, but the letter from Rastislav to Michael III states clearly that Rastislav's people "had already rejected paganism and adhere to the Christian law." Rastislav is said to have expelled missionaries of the Roman Church and instead turned to Constantinople for ecclesiastical assistance and, presumably, a degree of political support. The Emperor quickly chose to send Cyril, accompanied by his brother Methodius. The request provided a convenient opportunity to expand Byzantine influence. Their first work seems to have been the training of assistants. In 863, they began the task of translating the Gospels and necessary liturgical books into the language now known as Old Church Slavonic and traveled to Great Moravia to promote it. They enjoyed considerable success in this endeavour. However, they came into conflict with German ecclesiastics who opposed their efforts to create a specifically Slavic liturgy.

For the purpose of this mission, they devised the Glagolitic alphabet, the first alphabet to be used for Slavonic manuscripts. The Glagolitic alphabet was suited to match the specific features of the Slavic language. Its descendant script, the Cyrillic, is still used by many languages today.

The brothers wrote the first Slavic Civil Code, which was used in Great Moravia. The language derived from Old Church Slavonic, known as Church Slavonic, is still used in liturgy by several Orthodox Churches and also in some Eastern Catholic churches.

It is impossible to determine with certainty exactly what the brothers translated. The New Testament and the Psalms seem to have been the first, followed by other lessons from the Old Testament. The "Translatio" speaks only of a version of the Gospels by Cyril, and the "Vita Methodii" only of the "evangelium Slovenicum," though other liturgical selections may also have been translated.

Nor is it known for sure which liturgy, that of Rome or that of Constantinople, they took as a source. They may well have used the Roman alphabet, as suggested by liturgical fragments which adhere closely to the Latin type. This view is confirmed by the "Prague Fragments" and by certain Old Glagolitic liturgical fragments brought from Jerusalem to Kyiv and discovered there by Izmail Sreznevsky—probably the oldest document for the Slavonic tongue; these adhere closely to the Latin type, as is shown by the words "Mass," "Preface," and the name of one Felicitas. In any case, the circumstances were such that the brothers could hope for no permanent success without obtaining the authorization of Rome.

Journey to Rome

The mission of Constantine and Methodius had great success among Slavs in part because they used the people's native language rather than Latin or Greek. In Great Moravia, Constantine and Methodius also encountered missionaries from East Francia, representing the western or Latin branch of the Church, and more particularly representing the Carolingian Empire as founded by Charlemagne, and committed to linguistic, and cultural uniformity. They insisted on the use of the Latin liturgy, and they regarded Moravia and the Slavic peoples as part of their rightful mission field.

When friction developed, the brothers, unwilling to be a cause of dissension among Christians, decided to travel to Rome to see the Pope, and seek a solution that would avoid quarreling between missionaries in the field. In 867, Pope Nicholas I (858-867) invited the brothers to Rome. Their evangelizing mission in Moravia had by this time become the focus of a dispute with Archbishop Adalwin of Salzburg (859–873) and Bishop Ermanrich of Passau (866-874), who claimed ecclesiastical control of the same territory and wished to see it use the Latin liturgy exclusively.

Travelling with the relics of Saint Clement and a retinue of disciples, and passing through Pannonia (the Balaton Principality), where they were well received by Prince Koceľ. This activity in Pannonia made a continuation of conflicts inevitable with the German episcopate, and especially with the bishop of Salzburg, to whose jurisdiction Pannonia had belonged for seventy-five years. As early as 865, Bishop Adalwin was found to exercise Episcopal rights there, and the administration under him was in the hands of the archpriest Riehbald. The latter was obliged to retire to Salzburg, but his superior was naturally disinclined to abandon his claims.

The brothers sought support from Rome, and arrived there in 868, where they were warmly received. This was partly due to their bringing with them the relics of Saint Clement; the rivalry with Constantinople as to the jurisdiction over the territory of the Slavs would incline Rome to value the brothers and their influence.

New Pope Adrian II (867-872) gave Methodius the title of Archbishop of Sirmium (now Sremska Mitrovica in Serbia) and sent him back in 869, with jurisdiction over all of Moravia and Pannonia, and authorisation to use the Slavonic Liturgy. The brothers were praised for their learning and cultivated for their influence in Constantinople. Anastasius Bibliothecarius would later call Cyril "a man of apostolic life" and "a man of great wisdom". Their project in Moravia found support from Pope Adrian II, who formally authorized the use of the new Slavic liturgy. Subsequently, Methodius was ordained as priest by the pope himself, and five Slavic disciples were ordained as priests (Saint Gorazd, Saint Clement of Ohrid and Saint Naum) and as deacons (Saint Angelar and Saint Sava) by the prominent bishops Formosus and Gauderic. Since the 10th century Cyril and Methodius along with these five disciples are collectively venerated by the Bulgarian Orthodox Church as the “Seven Saints". The newly made priests officiated in their own languages at the altars of some of the principal churches. Feeling his end approaching, Cyril became a Basilian monk, was given the new name Cyril, and died in Rome fifty days later (14 February 869). There is some question as to assertion of the Translatio (ix.) that he was made a bishop.

The statement of the "Vita" that Methodius was made bishop in 870 and not raised to the dignity of an archbishop until 873 is contradicted by the brief of Pope John VIII, written in June 879, according to which Adrian consecrated him archbishop; John includes in his jurisdiction not only Great Moravia and Pannonia, but Serbia as well.

Methodius alone

Methodius now continued the work among the Slavs alone; not at first in Great Moravia, but in Pannonia (in the Balaton Principality), owing to the political circumstances of the former country, where Rastislav had been taken captive by his nephew Svatopluk in 870, then delivered over to Carloman of Bavaria, and condemned in a diet held at Regensburg at the end of 870. At the same time, the East Frankish rulers and their bishops decided to remove Methodius. The archiepiscopal claims of Methodius were considered such an injury to the rights of Salzburg that he was captured and forced to answer to East Frankish bishops: Adalwin of Salzburg, Ermanrich of Passau, and Anno of Freising. After a heated discussion, they declared the deposition of the intruder, and ordered him to be sent to Germany, where he was kept prisoner in a monastery for two and a half years.

In spite of the strong representations of the Conversio Bagoariorum et Carantanorum, written in 871 to influence the pope, though not avowing this purpose, Rome declared emphatically for Methodius, and sent a bishop, Paul of Ancona, to reinstate him and punish his enemies, after which both parties were commanded to appear in Rome with the legate.
Thus in 873, new Pope John VIII (872-882) secured the release of Methodius, but instructed him to stop using the Slavonic Liturgy.

Methodius' final years
The papal will prevailed, and Methodius secured his freedom and his archiepiscopal authority over both Great Moravia and Pannonia, though the use of Slavonic for the mass was still denied to him. His authority was restricted in Pannonia when after Koceľ's death the principality was administered by German nobles; but Svatopluk now ruled with practical independence in Great Moravia, and expelled the German clergy. This apparently secured an undisturbed field of operation for Methodius, and the Vita (x.) depicts the next few years (873–879) as a period of fruitful progress. Methodius seems to have disregarded, wholly or in part, the prohibition of the Slavonic liturgy; and when Frankish clerics again found their way into the country, and the archbishop's strictness had displeased the licentious Svatopluk, this was made a cause of complaint against him at Rome, coupled with charges regarding the Filioque.

In 878, Methodius was summoned to Rome on charges of heresy and using Slavonic. This time Pope John was convinced by the arguments that Methodius made in his defence and sent him back cleared of all charges, and with permission to use Slavonic. The Carolingian bishop who succeeded him, Witching, suppressed the Slavonic Liturgy and forced the followers of Methodius into exile. Many found refuge with Knyaz Boris the Baptizer in Bulgaria, under whom they reorganized the Bulgarian Slavic-speaking Church. Meanwhile, Pope John's successors adopted a Latin-only policy which lasted for centuries.

Methodius vindicated his orthodoxy at Rome, the more easily as the creed was still recited there without the Filioque, and promised to obey in regard to the liturgy. The other party was conciliated by giving him a Swabian, Wiching, as his coadjutor. When relations were strained between the two, John VIII steadfastly supported Methodius; but after his death (December 882) the archbishop's position became insecure, and his need of support induced Goetz to accept the statement of the Vita (xiii.) that he went to visit the Eastern emperor.

It was not until after Methodius' death, which is placed on 6 April 885, that the animosity erupted into an open conflict. Gorazd, whom Methodius had designated as his successor, was not recognised by Pope Stephen V. The same Pope forbade the use of the Slavic liturgy and placed the infamous  as Methodius' successor. The latter exiled the disciples of the two brothers from Great Moravia in 885. They fled to the First Bulgarian Empire, where they were welcomed and commissioned to establish theological schools - the Preslav and Ohrid literary schools. In the school in Preslav they devised the Cyrillic script on the basis of the Greek and Glagolitic alphabets. Cyrillic gradually replaced Glagolitic as the alphabet of the Old Bulgarian, which became the official language of the Bulgarian Empire and later spread to the Eastern Slav lands of Kievan Rus'. Cyrillic eventually spread throughout most of the Slavic world to become the standard alphabet in the Eastern Orthodox Slavic countries. Hence, the efforts of Cyril and Methodius and their disciples also paved the way for the spread of Christianity throughout Eastern Europe.

Methodius' body was buried in the main cathedral church of Great Moravia. Until today it remains an open question which city was capital of Great Moravia and therefore the place of Methodius' eternal rest remains unknown.

Invention of the Glagolitic and Cyrillic alphabets

The Glagolitic and Cyrillic alphabets are the oldest known Slavic alphabets, and were created by the two brothers and/or their students, to translate the Gospels and liturgical books into the Slavic languages. The early Glagolitic alphabet was used in Great Moravia between 863 (the arrival of Cyril and Methodius) and 885 (the expulsion of their students) for government and religious documents and books, and at the Great Moravian Academy (Veľkomoravské učilište) founded by Cyril, where followers of Cyril and Methodius were educated, by Methodius himself among others. The alphabet has been traditionally attributed to Cyril. That attribution has been confirmed explicitly by the papal letter Industriae tuae (880) approving the use of Old Church Slavonic, which says that the alphabet was "invented by Constantine the Philosopher". The term invention need not exclude the possibility of the brothers having made use of earlier letters, but implies only that before that time the Slavic languages had no distinct script of their own.

The early Cyrillic alphabet was developed in the First Bulgarian Empire and later finalized and spread by disciples Kliment and Naum in the Ohrid and Preslav schools of Knyaz Boris I Baptizer as a simplification of the Glagolitic alphabet which more closely resembled the Greek alphabet. It was developed by the disciples of Saints Cyril and Methodius at the Preslav Literary School (previously in Pliska as Pliska Literary School) at the end of the 9th century.

After the death of Cyril, Clement of Ohrid accompanied Methodius from Rome to Pannonia and Great Moravia. After the death of Methodius in 885, Clement headed the struggle against the German clergy in Great Moravia along with Gorazd. After spending some time in jail, he was expelled from Great Moravia, and in 885 or 886 reached the borders of the Bulgarian Empire together with Naum of Preslav, Angelarius, and possibly Gorazd (according to other sources, Gorazd was already dead by that time). The four of them were afterwards sent to the Bulgarian capital of Pliska, where they were commissioned by Boris I to instruct the future clergy of the state in the Slavonic language.

After the adoption of Christianity in 865, religious ceremonies in Bulgaria were conducted in Greek by clergy sent from the Byzantine Empire. Fearing growing Byzantine influence and weakening of the state, Boris viewed the adoption of the Old Slavonic language as a way to preserve the political independence and stability of Bulgaria, so he established two literary schools (academies), in Pliska and Ohrid, where theology was to be taught in the Slavonic language. While Naum of Preslav stayed in Pliska working on the foundation of the Pliska Literary School, Clement was commissioned by Boris I to organise the teaching of theology to future clergymen in Old Church Slavonic at the Ohrid Literary School. For seven years (886-893) Clement taught some 3,500 students in the Slavonic language and the Glagolitic alphabet.

Commemoration
Saints Cyril and Methodius' Day

The canonization process was much more relaxed in the decades following Cyril's death than today. Cyril was regarded by his disciples as a saint soon after his death. His following spread among the nations he evangelized and subsequently to the wider Christian Church, and he was famous as a holy man, along with his brother Methodius. There were calls for Cyril's canonization from the crowds lining the Roman streets during his funeral procession. The brothers' first appearance in a papal document is in Grande Munus of Leo XIII in 1880. They are known as the "Apostles of the Slavs", and are still highly regarded by both Roman Catholic and Orthodox Christians. Their feast day is currently celebrated on 14 February in the Roman Catholic Church (to coincide with the date of St Cyril's death); on 11 May in the Eastern Orthodox Church (though for Eastern Orthodox Churches which use the Julian Calendar this is 24 May according to the Gregorian calendar); and on 7 July according to the old sanctoral calendar that existed before the revisions of the Second Vatican Council. The celebration also commemorates the introduction of literacy and the preaching of the gospels in the Slavonic language by the brothers. The brothers were declared "Patrons of Europe" in 1980.

The first recorded secular celebration of Saints Cyril and Methodius' Day as the "Day of the Bulgarian script", as traditionally accepted by Bulgarian history, was held in the town of Plovdiv on 11 May 1851, when a local Bulgarian school was named "Saints Cyril and Methodius": both acts on the initiative of the prominent Bulgarian educator Nayden Gerov, although an Armenian traveller mentioned his visit to the "celebration of the Bulgarian script" in the town of Shumen on 22 May 1803.

Cyril and Methodius are remembered in the Church of England with a Lesser Festival and with a lesser feast on the Episcopal Church calendar on 14 February.

The day is now celebrated as a public holiday in the following countries:

 In Bulgaria it is celebrated on 24 May and is known as the "Bulgarian Education and Culture, and Slavonic Script Day" (Bulgarian: Ден на българската просвета и култура и на славянската писменост), a national holiday celebrating Bulgarian culture and literature as well as the alphabet. It is also known as "Alphabet, Culture, and Education Day" (Bulgarian: Ден на азбуката, културата и просвещението). Saints Cyril and Methodius are patrons of the National Library of Bulgaria. There is a monument to them in front of the library. Saints Cyril and Methodius are the most celebrated saints in the Bulgarian Orthodox church, and icons of the two brothers can be found in every church.
 In North Macedonia, it is celebrated on 24 May and is known as the "Saints Cyril and Methodius, Slavonic Enlighteners' Day", a national holiday. The Government of the Republic of Macedonia enacted a statute of the national holiday in October 2006 and the Parliament of the Republic of Macedonia passed a corresponding law at the beginning of 2007. Previously it had only been celebrated in the schools. It is also known as the day of the "Solun Brothers".
 In the Czech Republic and Slovakia, the two brothers were originally commemorated on 9 March, but Pope Pius IX changed this date to 5 July for several reasons. Today, Saints Cyril and Methodius are revered there as national saints and their name day (5 July), "Sts Cyril and Methodius Day" is a national holiday in Czech Republic and Slovakia. In the Czech Republic it is celebrated as "Slavic Missionaries Cyril and Methodius Day" (Czech: Den slovanských věrozvěstů Cyrila a Metoděje); in Slovakia it is celebrated as "St. Cyril and Metod Day" (Slovak: Sviatok svätého Cyrila a Metoda).
 In Russia, it is celebrated on 24 May and is known as the "Slavonic Literature and Culture Day" (Russian: День славянской письменности и культуры), celebrating Slavonic culture and literature as well as the alphabet. Its celebration is ecclesiastical (11 May in the Church's Julian calendar). It is not a public holiday in Russia.

The saints' feast day is celebrated by the Eastern Orthodox Church on 11 May and by the Roman Catholic Church and the Anglican Communion on 14 February as "Saints Cyril and Methodius Day". The Lutheran Churches of Western Christianity commemorate the two saints either on 14 February or 11 May. The Byzantine Rite Lutheran Churches celebrate Saints Cyril and Methodius Day on 24 May.

Other commemoration
The national library of Bulgaria in Sofia, Ss. Cyril and Methodius University of Skopje in the North Macedonia, and St. Cyril and St. Methodius University of Veliko Tarnovo in Bulgaria and in Trnava, Slovakia, bear the name of the two saints. Faculty of Theology at Palacký University in Olomouc (Czech Republic), bears the name "Saints Cyril and Methodius Faculty of Theology". In the United States, SS. Cyril and Methodius Seminary in Orchard Lake, Michigan, bears their name.

The Brotherhood of Saints Cyril and Methodius established in 1846 was short-lived a pro-Ukrainian organization in the Russian Empire to preserve Ukrainian national identity.

Saints Cyril and Methodius are the main patron saints of the Archdiocese of Ljubljana. Ljubljana Cathedral stands at Cyril and Methodius Square. They are also patron saints of the Greek-Catholic Eparchy of Košice (Slovakia) and the Slovak Greek Catholic Eparchy of Toronto.

St. Cyril Peak and St. Methodius Peak in the Tangra Mountains on Livingston Island, South Shetland Islands, in Antarctica are named for the brothers.

Saint Cyril's remains are interred in a shrine-chapel within the Basilica di San Clemente in Rome. The chapel holds a Madonna by Sassoferrato.

The Basilica of SS. Cyril and Methodius in Danville, Pennsylvania, (the only Roman Catholic basilica dedicated to SS. Cyril and Methodius in the world) is the motherhouse chapel of the Sisters of SS. Cyril and Methodius, a Roman Catholic women's religious community of pontifical right dedicated to apostolic works of ecumenism, education, evangelization, and elder care.

The Order of Saints Cyril and Methodius, originally founded in 1909, is part of the national award system of Bulgaria.

In 2021, a research vessel newly acquired by the Bulgarian Navy was re-christened Ss. Cyril and Methodius after the saints, with actress Maria Bakalova as the sponsor.

Gallery

Names in other relevant languages
  (Kýrillos kaí Methódios)
 Old Church Slavonic (Old Bulgarian): Кѷриллъ и Меѳодїи
  (Kiril i Metodiy)
 
 
  (Kiril i Metodij)
 New Church Slavonic: Кѷрі́ллъ и҆ Меѳо́дїй (Kỳrill" i Methodij)
 
  (Kirill i Mefodij), pre-1918 spelling:  (Kirill" i Methodij)
  / 
 
 
  (Kyrylo i Mefodij'')

See also

 Cyrillo-Methodian studies
 Brotherhood of Saints Cyril and Methodius
 Byzantine Empire
 Glagolitic alphabet
 SS. Cyril and Methodius Seminary
 SS. Cyril and Methodius University of Skopje
 SS. Cyril and Methodius National Library in Sofia
 St. Cyril and Methodius University of Veliko Tarnovo
 Saints Cyril and Methodius Faculty of Theology, Palacký University of Olomouc

References

Citations

Sources

Further reading

External links

 Slavorum Apostoli by Pope John Paul II
 Cyril and Methodius – Encyclical letter (Epistola Enciclica), 31 December 1980 by Pope John Paul II
 
 "Equal to Apostles SS. Cyril and Methodius Teachers of Slavs", by Prof. Nicolai D. Talberg
 Pope Leo XIII, "Grande munus: on Saints Cyril and Methodius
 Cyril and Methodius at orthodoxwiki
 Bulgarian Official Holidays, National Assembly of the Republic of Bulgaria: in English, in Bulgarian
 Bank holidays in the Czech Republic, Czech National Bank: in English, in Czech
 24 May – The Day Of Slavonic Alphabet, Bulgarian Enlightenment and Culture

815 births
827 births
869 deaths
885 deaths
Byzantine Thessalonians
Saints of medieval Macedonia
Saints of medieval Greece
Greek translators
Translators of the Bible into Church Slavonic
Byzantine theologians
Cyrillic script
Saints duos
Great Moravia
Public holidays in Russia
Creators of writing systems
Greek Christian missionaries
Medieval Bulgarian saints
Old Church Slavonic writers
9th-century Byzantine people
9th-century Christian saints
Burials at San Clemente al Laterano
Groups of Roman Catholic saints
Groups of Eastern Orthodox saints
9th-century Christian theologians
9th-century Byzantine writers
 
Anglican saints
Missionary linguists
0862